Andrea Aghini Lombardi (born 29 December 1963 in Livorno, Tuscany) is an Italian rally driver. He won the 1992 Rallye Sanremo and took four other podium finishes in the World Rally Championship from 1992 to 1995. In 1992, he also won the Race of Champions, after beating Carlos Sainz in the semi-final and Colin McRae in the final.

Career
Aghini began his rallying career on national events with a Peugeot 205 GTI in 1984. He debuted in the World Rally Championship driving a Renault 5 GT Turbo at his home event, the Rallye San Remo, in 1986. He retired from the rally after a turbo problem, but two years later, he won the Group N class of the event. For the 1991 season, Aghini got a contract with the Lancia-supported Jolly Club team for two WRC events; the Sanremo and the Rally Catalunya. He drove his Delta Integrale 16V to fifth place in both rallies, taking his first drivers' world championship points.

These results earned Aghini a drive with Martini Racing, Lancia's factory team, for the following season. He finished sixth at the Tour de Corse, and then edged out his team-mate Juha Kankkunen to take his first and only world rally win in Sanremo. Aghini's second podium finish followed in Catalunya. After Lancia withdrew from the WRC, he moved back to Jolly Club to partner defending world champion Carlos Sainz. His only podium finish of the season came at the Rally Portugal, where he took third place behind Ford's François Delecour and Miki Biasion.

In 1994, Aghini partnered Kankkunen and Didier Auriol at the Toyota factory team in a few events and finished third at the Tour de Corse with a Celica Turbo 4WD. He repeated this feat in the 1995 season, driving a Mitsubishi Lancer Evolution 3 for the Team Mitsubishi Ralliart. With consistent results, he also equalled his career-best seventh place in the drivers' championship from 1992. Aghini then became less active in the WRC. He won the Italian Rally Championship with a Toyota Corolla WRC in 1998 and 1999. In 1998, he also finished runner-up in the European Rally Championship.

Results

WRC results

References

External links
Aghini at World Rally Archive

1963 births
Italian rally drivers
Living people
World Rally Championship drivers
Sportspeople from Livorno